Olshanske is an urban-type settlement in Mykolaiv Raion, Mykolaiv Oblast, Ukraine. It hosts the administration of Olshanske settlement hromada, one of the hromadas of Ukraine. Population: 

History
In 1961, a construction of a big cement plant started. The settlement serving the plant was known as the Hryhorievka Cement Plant and belonged to Varvarivka Raion of Mykolaiv Oblast. In 1963, Varvarivka Raion was abolished and Mykolaiv Raion was established. In 1968, Hryhorievka Cement Plant was renamed Olshanske, to commemorate Konstantin Olshansky, a Hero of the Soviet Union, and it was granted urban-type settlement status.

Economy
The settlement serves a cement plant which belonged to Dyckerhoff AG.

Transportation
There is a railway station in Olshanske on the railway line connecting Mykolaiv and Tokarivka, with further connections to Odesa and Voznesensk.

References

Urban-type settlements in Mykolaiv Raion